Alasaqqal (also romanized as Ālāsaqqal, Ālāsaqal, and Ālāsaqāl) is a village in Saruq Rural District, Takht-e Soleyman District, Takab County, West Azerbaijan Province, Iran. At the 2006 census, its population was 261, in 49 families.

References 

Populated places in Takab County